Calopogon oklahomensis, commonly known as the Oklahoma grass pink or prairie grass pink, is a terrestrial species of orchid native to the United States. It is restricted to the states of Alabama, Arkansas, Georgia, Illinois, Indiana, Iowa, Kansas, Louisiana, Minnesota, Mississippi, Missouri, Oklahoma, South Carolina, Tennessee, Texas, and Wisconsin. It is extirpated (locally extinct) throughout most of its range. Calopogon oklahomensis is a perennial herb with flowers that are white, pink or purple, with a labellum with an apical region of yellow hairs. Flowers bloom March to July. Its habitats include coastal prairies, savannas, edges of bogs, and oak woodlands. It was described by Douglas H. Goldman in 1995.

References

External links 
 Photographs_of_this_species_by_Charles_Lewallen

oklahomensis
Endemic orchids of the United States
Flora of Oklahoma
Flora of the United States
Flora of Alabama
Plants described in 1995